"What Greater Love" was a top ten hit in New Zealand for singer Nash Chase in 1970.

Background

The record
On the week ending with 5 September 1970, it was reported by the Billboard magazine that "What Greater Love" was in the New Zealand charts at position 10. The single backed with "Raindrops Keep Falling On My Head" was released on the Ode label.  By 27 July 1970, the single had entered the NZ charts at no. 20. By 31 August, it had climbed from no. 17 to no. 10.

The singer
In 1970, Chase was a newcomer to the pop scene. His brother Frank had already released a single "The Frog" bw "Popeye Dance" on the Pye the previous year.
In July of that year he won the Wanganui Talent Quest. In August, he won the 1970 New Faces competition.  Prior to this hit, Chase had previously released a single "Sound Of Love" backed with "My Special Prayer" on Ode.

References

1970 singles
1970 songs
Nash Chase songs
Songs written by Teddy Randazzo